Probable G-protein coupled receptor 116 is a protein that in humans is encoded by the GPR116 gene.  GPR116 has now been shown to play an essential role in the regulation of lung surfactant homeostasis.

References

Further reading 

 
 
 

G protein-coupled receptors